Saint-Denis-sur-Scie (literally Saint-Denis on Scie) is a commune in the Seine-Maritime department in the Normandy region in northern France.

Geography

Heraldry

Population

Places of interest
 The church of St. Denis, dating from the seventeenth century.
 The nineteenth-century chateau of Bosmelet and its park.
 A chapel, once part of a leper hospital.

See also
Communes of the Seine-Maritime department

References

Communes of Seine-Maritime